Tell el-Burak is located in a lush agricultural section of southern littoral of Lebanon, it has been under investigation by the American University of Beirut and the University of Tübingen since 1998. The excavations have revealed three occupations on the tell, the latest in the Ottoman Period, the next in the Iron Age, and the earliest in the Middle Bronze Age.

Excavations
The German-Lebanese team of archaeologists had conducted most of the excavations of Tell el-Burak by 2011, and the study and analysis of the site is ongoing.

The tell stands prominently amidst agricultural lands on a strip of plain fronted by the Mediterranean Sea and backed by a range of hills. The plain, a well-watered zone, is home to a large agricultural area where fruit trees currently predominate.  The conical purpose-built tell towers above the plain to some 19 meters and is readily visible from both land and sea. From the top of mound, Sidon can be seen to the north, and to the south rising above Ras el-Qantara, the tell of the Late Bronze Age/Phoenician city of Sarepta can be seen.

Original construction 
During this earliest Middle Bronze Age stage, the mound was built as part of a defensive structure serving as the base for a fortress on its top.
 
 This appears to be the first MBA monumental fortified palace so far discovered in Lebanon. The fortress was built with mudbricks.

"Kingdom of Sidon"
According to archaeologists, Tell el-Burak excavations have helped significantly to clarify the history of the nearby Sidon during the MBA. Previously, there was a big gap in this history from the end of the Early Bronze Age until the middle of the 2nd millennium BC, when Sidon is first mentioned in the historical texts.

Sidon was clearly the big power centre at that time, that controlled significant territory. So there appears to have been the kingdom of Sidon that controlled el-Burak, and other areas.

Oldest wall paintings
The biggest room, measuring 7 by 14 meters, contained unusual wall paintings displaying Egyptian influence. The wall paintings are dated by researchers at 1900 BC. Trade connections at that time with Egypt and the Palestinian coast are also indicated by pottery studies.

Researchers believe that the site casts considerable light on the early history and development of the ‘’fresco’’ paintings in the entire Mediterranean, including the famous wall paintings of Minoan Crete,

 "According to Dr. Sader, the analysis of the painting technique revealed the presence of the oldest forerunner of fresco painting as the preliminary drawings were applied on the still wet plaster and combined with it. “The fresco painting technique may have originated and developed in the Levant long before its use in the later Minoan-Aegean paintings, namely on the island of Crete” she said."

Iron Age 
In the Iron Age, Tell el-Burak was home to a settlement that was prosperous and peaceful, as seen in its defenseless and fine architecture. There is no apparent occupation in the intervening Late Bronze Age as the site was seemingly abandoned in favor of Sarepta, four kilometers to the south.

In 2004, an underwater archaeological survey was conducted in the area of the tell by the archaeologist Ralph K. Pedersen. It indicated that there was no harbour or good anchorage near the site.

In September 2020, a winepress was discovered at Tell el-Burak, dates back to the seventh-century B.C.

See also
Cities of the ancient Near East

References

External links
Web site of excavation at the University of Tuebingen
 Website of the Project at the American University of Beirut (archived in 2017 - no longer updated)

Archaeological sites in Lebanon